Gregor Zabret (born 18 August 1995) is a Slovenian footballer who plays as a goalkeeper.

Club career

Domžale
Zabret was promoted to Domžale's first team in 2011, and made his first team debut on 26 November 2011, in a 2–0 home defeat against Celje.

Swansea City
On 2 July 2013, Zabret signed a two-year deal with Swansea City, for an undisclosed fee.

In July 2015, Zabret signed a one-year contract extension with Swansea, keeping him at the club until June 2016. Zabret signed a new two-year contract in July 2016.

On 3 February 2020, Zabret left the club following his contract being mutually terminated.

Loan to Oldham Athletic
On 5 July 2019, Zabret signed for League Two side Oldham Athletic on a season-long loan.

Aberystwyth Town
On 8 August 2021, Zabret signed for Cymru Premier side Aberystwyth Town.

International career
Zabret has represented Slovenia at under-16, under-17, under-19, and under-21 levels.

References

External links
Player profile at NZS 

1995 births
Living people
Footballers from Ljubljana
Slovenian footballers
Association football goalkeepers
NK Domžale players
Swansea City A.F.C. players
Oldham Athletic A.F.C. players
Aberystwyth Town F.C. players
Slovenian PrvaLiga players
Cymru Premier players
Slovenian expatriate footballers
Slovenian expatriate sportspeople in the United Kingdom
Expatriate footballers in Wales
Slovenian expatriate sportspeople in England
Expatriate footballers in England
Slovenia youth international footballers
Slovenia under-21 international footballers